Pseudocleopatra is a genus of freshwater snails in the family Paludomidae (subfamily Cleopatrinae).

Species
, four extant and seven extinct species are accepted in the genus Pseudocleopatra:
 Pseudocleopatra broecki 
 † Pseudocleopatra carinata  
 Pseudocleopatra dartevellei 
 † Pseudocleopatra glaubrechti  
 † Pseudocleopatra likeae  
 † Pseudocleopatra musiimei  
 † Pseudocleopatra rotunda  
 Pseudocleopatra togoensis 
 Pseudocleopatra voltana 
 † Pseudocleopatra wamalai  
 † Pseudocleopatra wilsoni

References

Further reading
 Brown, D. S. (1980). Freshwater snails of Africa and their medical importance. Taylor & Francis, London. 1-487

Paludomidae